Näsviken is a locality situated in Hudiksvall Municipality, Gävleborg County, Sweden with 924 inhabitants in 2010.

Sports
The following sports clubs are located in Näsviken:

 Näsvikens IK

References 

Populated places in Hudiksvall Municipality
Hälsingland